Raszowa  is a village in the administrative district of Gmina Lubin, within Lubin County, Lower Silesian Voivodeship, in south-western Poland.

History
The village was first mentioned in Old Polish as Rasowa in a 1267 deed, when it was part of fragmented Piast-ruled Poland. 

During World War II, the Germans operated a forced labor subcamp of the Stalag VIII-A prisoner-of-war camp in the village.

From 1975–1998 it was located in the former Legnica Voivodeship.

References

Raszowa